Lieutenant General Yogesh Kumar Joshi, PVSM, UYSM, AVSM, VrC, SM, ADC (born 5 January 1962) is a retired General Officer of the Indian Army. He was the General Officer Commanding-in-Chief Northern Command, assuming office from Lt Gen Ranbir Singh on 1 February 2020.
He last served as the Chief of staff of the Northern Command, assuming the office from Lt Gen SK Sharma. Previously, he was the commander of Leh based Fire & Fury Corps. As Army Commander he is credited with spearheading the Indian response to PLA's attempt to alter the status quo on Line of Actual Control (LAC) by use of force. He is the only war decorated Army Commander who has to his credit successes against both Indian adversaries China and Pakistan.

Early life and education 
Gen Joshi hails from Faridabad, Haryana but has done his schooling from Jhansi and Faridabad, thus giving him a pan India exposure as a child and teenager and is the son of R P Joshi. He is a graduate of the 60th course and was allotted Kilo  "K" squadron at the National Defence Academy, Khadakwasla, Pune, Maharashtra. Then he attended Indian Military Academy, Dehradun.

Career 
He was commissioned into 13 Jammu and Kashmir Rifles. His instructional tenure was at Infantry School Mhow where he was responsible to impart training on Anti Tank Weapon Systems. Being an epitome of a 'scholar warrior'  he attended Defense Services Staff College, Wellington and was posted to Military Operations Directorate for the first time, since then he has served in Military Operations directorate thrice in various capacities which have enriched his professional competencies in the operational paradigm to include both putative adversaries of India, namely China and Pakistan. He had the distinction to command his Brigade in Eastern Ladakh and also the Division in the same area, thus giving him first hand ground knowledge which held him in good stead during Operation SNOW LEOPARD. He has also served as the ADG of Military Operations Branch in the Army HQ during the critical period of Surgical Strikes against Pakistan in 2016 and was responsible for the planning of the operations at the Military Operations Branch. Prior to his appointment as GOC of XIV Corp he was DG Infantry and spearheaded the modernization drive of the infantry with missionary zeal and a large number of weapon systems and equipment like the Sig Saur Rifle were procured under his tutelage. He is the colonel of the regiment of Jammu and Kashmir Rifles & the Ladakh Scouts and has been deeply involved with welfare and development of people of the remote region of Ladakh. He was the 17th Commander, XIV Corps of the Indian Army and assumed the post on 31 August 2018, This was General Joshi's fourth tenure dealing with Chinese troops. He assumed the post from Lt General Santosh Kumar Upadhya.

Kargil War 
He was a Lt colonel during Kargil War. He led 13th Battalion of the JAK Rif in Dras. His battalion launched four attacks, most successful of which was on Pt 4875 which is now called Batra Top after Capt. Vikram Batra who was martyred in action and was awarded the Param Vir Chakra. The Battalion was also conferred with the title of the 'Bravest Of the Brave' His battalion was awarded a total more than twenty five Gallantry medals during Kargil War including two Param Vir Chakras, eight Vir Chakras (including him) and fourteen Sena Medals. He was the commanding officer of Param Vir Chakra awardees Captain Vikram Batra and Rifleman Sanjay Kumar. His role during the Kargil War was essayed by Sanjay Datt in the movie LOC Kargil directed by JP Datta. As an officer and a gentleman his gesture of giving an honourable burial to troops of Pakistan Army who had perished on the icy heights of Kargil fetched him praise and also a sobriquet of a 'humane warrior'. His professional acumen and personal bravery was a beacon of inspiration for the soldiers of his unit who displayed bravery and courage beyond the call of duty to achieve victory under most trying circumstances. His CODE WORD during the battle was 'CHANAKYA' and instilled fear amongst the Pakistani soldiers who were fighting in Kargil.

An expert on China 
The uniqueness that Gen Joshi brings to his office is not only his knowledge of the Chinese language but also the fact that he has served thrice before in the eastern Ladakh sector and has commanded a Brigade and a Division before taking over as commander of Fire & Fury Corps.  He also served as a Defence Attache to China (2005-2008) and negotiated the technicalities of the first India-China joint exercise “Hand-in-Hand” in Kunming in 2007 and led Army talks with China. The PLA holds him in great esteem and are in awe of his capacities as a soldier and diplomat. During the various meetings held after the Galwan incident the Chinese generals had displayed great reverence and were always cognizant of his presence as the Theatre Commander. His valuable insights on China, PLA and their capacities were banked upon by the highest decision-making body in military matters in India.

Vir Chakra Citation 
The citation for the Vir Chakra reads as follows

Awards and decorations
During his career, he has been awarded with Param Vishisht Seva Medal in January 2022, Uttam Yudh Seva Medal for commanding the Fire & Fury Corps (Republic Day 2020), Ati Vishisht Seva Medal (Republic Day 2016), the Vir Chakra (Independence Day 1999) for his part in the Operation Vijay and the Sena Medal.

Dates of rank

In popular culture
Gen Joshi has been portrayed twice in films, first by actor Sanjay Dutt in LOC: Kargil (2003) and second by actor Shataf Figar in Shershaah (2021).

See also 

 Anuj Nayyar
 Yeh Dil Maange More!

References

External links 
Video about Captain Vikram Batra showing a reenactment of his final battle during Kargil War, narrated by his then-commanding officer, Yogesh Kumar Joshi.

1962 births
Living people
National Defence Academy (India) alumni
Indian Army officers
Indian generals
Recipients of the Ati Vishisht Seva Medal
Recipients of the Vir Chakra
Recipients of the Sena Medal
Sena Medal
Recipients of the Param Vishisht Seva Medal
Indian military attachés

hi:योगेश कुमार जोशी